A by-election was held for the New South Wales Legislative Assembly district of Dubbo on 20 November 2004. It was triggered by the death of Tony McGrane.

The by-election saw McGrane succeeded by another independent in Dawn Fardell.

Background

On 15 September 2004, the independent sitting member Tony McGrane for Dubbo died after a battle with liver cancer. McGrane was first elected at the 1999 state election and re-elected at the 2003 state election. His death triggered a by-election for the vacant seat.

However, the seat was won instead by another independent, Dubbo deputy mayor Dawn Fardell.

Nor was it contested by the opposition , who deferred to their junior coalition partner the National Party, as is typical in regional districts.

Dates

Results

Tony McGrane died.

See also
Electoral results for the district of Dubbo
List of New South Wales state by-elections

References 

2004 elections in Australia
New South Wales state by-elections
2000s in New South Wales